Badhra Assembly constituency is one of the 90 Vidhan Sabha constituencies in Haryana state in northern India.

Overview
Previously in Bhiwani district, Badhra became part of the new Charkhi Dadri district in 2016.

Badhra is part of Bhiwani-Mahendragarh Lok Sabha constituency along with eight other Assembly segments, namely, Dadri, Bhiwani, Tosham and Loharu in this district and Ateli, Mahendragarh, Narnaul and Nangal Chaudhry in Mahendragarh district.

Members of Legislative Assembly

See also
 Bhiwani

References

Assembly constituencies of Haryana
Bhiwani district